Anne of Bohemia and Austria (12 April 1432 – 13 November 1462) was a Duchess of Luxembourg in her own right and, as a consort, Landgravine of Thuringia and of Saxony.

She was the eldest daughter of Albert of Austria, the future Emperor-Elect and Elisabeth, queen of Bohemia, the sole descendant of Sigismund, Holy Roman Emperor.

Her posthumous brother Ladislaus, Duke of Austria (1440–57) succeeded, very underage, as king of Bohemia and later also as king of Hungary. Anne also had a younger sister, Elisabeth, who was to become later a queen of Poland and grand duchess of Lithuania.

On 2 June 1446 the young Anne was married to William "the Brave" of Saxony (1425–82), Landgrave of Thuringia, a younger son of Frederick I "the Warlike" of Saxony.

In right of Anne, William became Duke of Luxembourg from 1457 when Anne's brother Ladislaus died childless. Though, their rights to the land were disputed by Philip III, Duke of Burgundy, and in 1469, William concluded that the possession's keeping was untenable against Burgundian attacks, and retreated to his Thuringian lands – that however took place when Anne was already dead.

They had two surviving daughters:

 Margaret of Thuringia (1449 – 13 July 1501), who married John II, Elector of Brandenburg, and whose direct main heirs have been Electors of Brandenburg, then Kings of Prussia, and then German Emperors.
 Katharina of Thuringia (1453 – 10 July 1534), who married Duke Henry II of Münsterberg and who has surviving descendants, mainly among Bohemian high nobility.

Ancestry

References 

1432 births
1462 deaths
14th-century German nobility
14th-century German women
Dukes of Luxembourg
14th-century House of Habsburg
Pretenders to the Bohemian throne
Austria–Luxembourg relations
Landgravines of Thuringia
Pretenders to the Hungarian throne
Daughters of kings